Grell may refer to:

People with the surname
 Eduard Grell (18001886), German composer, organist, and music teacher
 Glen Grell (born 1956), Republican member of the Pennsylvania House of Representatives
 H. J. Grell (1866–?), American politician
 Karl Gottlieb Grell (1912–1994), German zoologist and protistologist
 Mervyn Grell (1899–1976), Trinidadian cricketer
 Mike Grell (born 1947), American comic book writer and artist
 Miranda Grell (born 1978), English Labour party politician found guilty of making false statements against her political opponent

Other
 Grell (Dungeons & Dragons), a creature in the role-playing game Dungeons & Dragons
 Grell Sutcliff, a character in the manga and anime series Black Butler
 "The Grell", an episode of The Outer Limits